Jesse Bruton (born 1933) is a British artist, and a founder of the Ikon Gallery in Birmingham. He gave up painting in 1972, to become a picture conservator.

Bruton was born in 1933 and was educated at Birmingham College of Art, where he later lectured.

He painted landscapes, and later abstract works.

He exhibited at the Royal Birmingham Society of Artists, and held solo exhibitions at Ikon in 1965 and 1967. A retrospective exhibition of his work was held at Ikon from July to September 2016. His painting Winding (1967–1968) is in the collection of Birmingham Museums Trust.

Publications

References

External links 

   Artist's Talk - Jesse Bruton and Pamela Scott Wilkie in conversation

1933 births
20th-century British painters
Living people
Conservator-restorers
British landscape painters
British abstract artists